Robert Blakey (1795–1878) was an English writer and academic, a Chartist radical and journalist. He is known also for works on fishing.

Life
The son of a mechanic, Robert Blakey, he was born at Morpeth 18 May 1795. He lost his father when just nine months old, and was taken charge of by his grandmother Elizabeth Laws at age six. From his ninth to his thirteenth year he assisted his uncle in gardening, after which he was apprenticed to the fur trade at Alnwick.

In 1815 Blakey returned to Morpeth, and began to contribute to the Newcastle Magazine, The Black Dwarf, Cobbett's Register, and the Durham Chronicle. At the beginning of 1838 he purchased the Northern Liberator, which had been founded by Augustus Hardin Beaumont in September 1837. Through its pages he played a central role in the organisation of Chartist agitation on Tyneside. The content of the Liberator under his control by no means ruled out the use of armed force.

In 1840 the Northern Liberator was amalgamated with The Champion, a London weekly paper, as The Northern Liberator and Champion, and published both at Newcastle and London. For the publication in his paper of an essay on the natural right of resistance to constituted authority, Blakey was prosecuted by the government, and bound over to keep the peace. Shortly afterwards he sold the paper, at a loss, and failing to start in London a paper called The Politician, he went to France, to study philosophy.

Blakey left radical politics permanently from this time. He visited the major libraries of Belgium, and was hired as assistant on a History of Social and Political Philosophy, which was not completed. In 1848 he was appointed professor of logic and metaphysics at Queen's College, Belfast, and in 1860 he received a civil list pension. The later years of his life were spent in London, where he died 26 October 1878. A volume of his Memoirs appeared in 1879, edited by Rev. Henry Miller.

Works
Blakey's major work was History of the Philosophy of Mind, embracing the opinions of all Writers on Mental Science from the Earliest Times to the Present Day, 4 vols. 1848, an encyclopedic work on European metaphysics. He followed generally the line of the Scottish Enlightenment, and French philosophy as represented by Victor Cousin's Cours. He drew on George Lewes and John Daniel Morell, Joseph Marie, baron de Gérando, Jacob Brucker and August Heinrich Ritter. With a chronological method, he succeeded in writing a popular work combining biography and short summaries of philosophical positions. Related books were:

Treatise on the Divine and Human Wills (1831).
History of Moral Science (1833, 2 vols.). 
Christian Hermits (1845).
Historical Sketch of Logic from the Earliest Times to the Present Day, 1851.
History of Political Literature from the Earliest Times, (1855, 2 vols.).

Other works were:

 A Life of James Beattie the poet, with the Rev. Daniel Paterson.
 Cottage Politics, or Letters on the New Poor Law Bill, 1837.
 Temporal Benefits of Christianity, 1849.
 Old Faces in New Masks 1859.
 A few Remarkable Events in the Life of Rev. Josiah Thompson, as Nathan Oliver, an apocryphal biography slanted against Dissenters.

Books on angling and shooting, his recreations:

 Hints on Angling, with suggestions for angling excursions in France and Belgium, to which are appended some brief notices of the English, Scotch, and Irish waters, 1846, as "Hackle Palmer".
 The Angler's Complete Guide to the Rivers and Lakes of England, 1853, and in 1854 a similar work on Scotland. 
 Angling, or How to angle and where to go, 1853.
 Shooting; a Manual of practical Information on this Branch of British Field Sports 1854.
 Historical Sketches of the Angling Literature of all Nations, 1855.
 The Angler's Song Book, 1855.

Notes

Attribution

1795 births
1878 deaths
English newspaper editors
English male journalists
Academics of Queen's University Belfast